Shez is an Israeli writer, poet and playwright.

Shez may also refer to:

 She'z, a South Korean girl group
 Shez (son of Heth), from the Book of Mormon
 Shez (son of Shez), a person from the Book of Mormon
 Shez, default name for the player's avatar in Fire Emblem Warriors: Three Hopes

See also
Chez (disambiguation)
Shaz (disambiguation)